The characteristic impedance or surge impedance (usually written Z0) of a uniform transmission line is the ratio of the amplitudes of voltage and current of a single wave propagating along the line; that is, a wave travelling in one direction in the absence of reflections in the other direction. Alternatively, and equivalently, it can be defined as the input impedance of a transmission line when its length is infinite. Characteristic impedance is determined by the geometry and materials of the transmission line and, for a uniform line, is not dependent on its length. The SI unit of characteristic impedance is the ohm.

The characteristic impedance of a lossless transmission line is purely real, with no reactive component. Energy supplied by a source at one end of such a line is transmitted through the line without being dissipated in the line itself. A transmission line of finite length (lossless or lossy) that is terminated at one end with an impedance equal to the characteristic impedance appears to the source like an infinitely long transmission line and produces no reflections.

Transmission line model 
The characteristic impedance  of an infinite transmission line at a given angular frequency  is the ratio of the voltage and current of a pure sinusoidal wave of the same frequency travelling along the line.  This relation is also the case for finite transmission lines until the wave reaches the end of the line. Generally, a wave is reflected back along the line in the opposite direction. When the reflected wave reaches the source, it is reflected yet again, adding to the transmitted wave and changing the ratio of the voltage and current at the input, causing the voltage-current ratio to no longer equal the characteristic impedance. This new ratio including the reflected energy is called the input impedance.

The input impedance of an infinite line is equal to the characteristic impedance since the transmitted wave is never reflected back from the end. Equivalently: The characteristic impedance of a line is that impedance which, when terminating an arbitrary length of line at its output, produces an input impedance of equal value. This is so because there is no reflection on a line terminated in its own characteristic impedance.

Applying the transmission line model based on the telegrapher's equations as derived below, the general expression for the characteristic impedance of a transmission line is:

where
 is the resistance per unit length, considering the two conductors to be in series,
 is the inductance per unit length,
 is the conductance of the dielectric per unit length,
 is the capacitance per unit length,
 is the imaginary unit, and
 is the angular frequency.

This expression extends to DC by letting  tend to 0.

A surge of energy on a finite transmission line will see an impedance of  prior to any reflections returning; hence surge impedance is an alternative name for characteristic impedance.
Although an infinite line is assumed, since all quantities are per unit length, the “per length” parts of all the units cancel, and the characteristic impedance is independent of the length of the transmission line.

The voltage and current phasors on the line are related by the characteristic impedance as:

where the subscripts (+) and (−) mark the separate constants for the waves traveling forward (+) and backward (−).

Derivation

Using telegrapher's equation 

The differential equations describing the dependence of the voltage and current on time and space are linear, so that a linear combination of solutions is again a solution. This means that we can consider solutions with a time dependence  – doing so is functionally equivalent of solving for the Fourier coefficients for voltage and current amplitudes at some fixed angular frequency  Doing so causes the time dependence to factor out, leaving an ordinary differential equation for the coefficients, which will be phasors, dependent on position (space) only. Moreover, the parameters can be generalized to be frequency-dependent.

Let

and

We find that

and

or

 and 

where

 and 

These two first-order equations are easily uncoupled by a second differentiation, with the results:

and

Notice that both  and  satisfy the same equation.

That is:

so

We can write the above equation as

which is correct for any transmission line in general. And for typical transmission lines, that are carefully built from wire with low loss resistance  and small insulation leakage conductance ; further, used for high frequencies, the inductive reactance  and the capacitive admittance  will both be large, so the constant  is very close to being a real number:

When we recombine the time-dependent part we obtain the full solution:

In order to be compatible, they must still satisfy the original differential equations, one of which is

or

For the co-efficients of 

For the co-efficients of 

Since 

hence, for valid solutions require

It can be seen that the constant , defined in the above equations has the dimensions of impedance (ratio of voltage to current) and is a function of primary constants of the line and operating frequency.

which holds generally, for any transmission line. For well-functioning transmission lines, with either  and  both very small, or with  very high, or all of the above, we get

hence the characteristic impedance is typically very close to being a real number. Manufacturers make commercial cables to approximate this condition very closely over a wide range of frequencies.

Alternative approach 
We follow an approach posted by Tim Healy. The line is modeled by a series of differential segments with differential series  and shunt  elements (as shown in the figure above). The characteristic impedance is defined as the ratio of the input voltage to the input current of a semi-infinite length of line.

The added  terms cancel, leaving

The first-power  terms are the highest remaining order.

In comparison to the factors whose  divided out, the last term, which still carries a remaining factor  is infinitesimal relative to the other, now finite terms, so we can drop it. That leads to

Reversing the sign  applied to the square root has the effect of reversing the direction of the flow of current.

Lossless line 
The analysis of lossless lines provides an accurate approximation for real transmission lines that simplifies the mathematics considered in modeling transmission lines. A lossless line is defined as a transmission line that has no line resistance and no dielectric loss. This would imply that the conductors act like perfect conductors and the dielectric acts like a perfect dielectric. For a lossless line, R and G are both zero, so the equation for characteristic impedance derived above reduces to:

In particular,  does not depend any more upon the frequency.
The above expression is wholly real, since the imaginary term  has canceled out, implying that  is purely resistive. The lossless line model is a useful approximation for many practical cases, such as low-loss transmission lines and transmission lines with high frequency.

The solutions to the long line transmission equations include incident and reflected portions of the voltage and current:

When the line is terminated with its characteristic impedance, the reflected portions of these equations are reduced to 0 and the solutions to the voltage and current along the transmission line are wholly incident. Without a reflection of the wave, the load that is being supplied by the line effectively blends into the line making it appear to be an infinite line. In a lossless line this implies that the voltage and current remain the same everywhere along the transmission line. Their magnitudes remain constant along the length of the line and are only rotated by a phase angle.

Surge impedance loading 
In electric power transmission, the characteristic impedance of a transmission line is expressed in terms of the surge impedance loading (SIL), or natural loading, being the power loading at which reactive power is neither produced nor absorbed:

Loaded below its SIL, the voltage at the load will be greater than the system voltage. Above it, the load voltage is depressed. The Ferranti effect describes the voltage gain towards the remote end of a very lightly loaded (or open ended) transmission line. Underground cables normally have a very low characteristic impedance, resulting in an SIL that is typically in excess of the thermal limit of the cable.

Practical examples 

The characteristic impedance of coaxial cables (coax) is commonly chosen to be  for RF and microwave applications. Coax for video applications is usually  for its lower loss.

See also 
  
  
 Iterative impedance, characteristic impedance is a limiting case of this

References

Sources

External links 

Electricity
Physical quantities
Distributed element circuits
Transmission lines

de:Leitungstheorie#Die allgemeine L.C3.B6sung der Leitungsgleichungen